Select commercially released recordings of Danny Elfman's music for film, television, stage and the concert hall. For a full list of Elfman's compositions, see List of compositions by Danny Elfman. For Elfman's recordings as lead singer/songwriter for Oingo Boingo, see the Oingo Boingo discography page.

Solo releases

Original scores

1980s and 1990s

2000s

2010s

2020s

Other
Albums that include themes or music written by Elfman where he did not compose the full score:

References

Elfman, Danny
Discography
Elfman, Danny